Kirsty Island is an island in Ryder Bay, west of Lagoon Island and East of Léonie Island. I has outcrops of reddish rocks and is used by scientists at Rothera Research Station as a site for marine research and recreation. It is named for Kirsty Brown, a marine biologist with the British Antarctic Survey (BAS) who lost her life whilst snorkelling at Rothera Station in July 2003.

References 

Islands of Adelaide Island